Horsburgh Lighthouse is an active lighthouse which marks the eastern entrance to the Straits of Singapore. It is situated on the island of Pedra Branca.

History
Horsburgh Lighthouse was named after Captain James Horsburgh (28 September 1762 – 14 May 1836), a Scottish hydrographer from the East India Company, who mapped many seaways around Singapore in the late 18th and early 19th century. He was called "the Nautical Oracle of the World". His charts and books allowed ships to navigate through treacherous areas of the ocean, saving many lives and property on the seas between China and India. On the wall of the Visitor's Room on the sixth floor of the lighthouse under the light room there is a panel with the following inscription:

Translated literally into English, the Latin inscription reads:

Location
The lighthouse was built over an outcrop of rocks that for centuries was identified on maps as Pedra Branca ("white rock" in Portuguese). It was built by John Turnbull Thomson (1821–1884), a government surveyor. In the presence of Governor William John Butterworth and other dignitaries, the lighthouse foundation stone was laid on 24 May 1850 and the lighthouse was completed in 1851. The lighthouse is also known as Pedra Branca Lighthouse.

The sovereignty of Pedra Branca was disputed between Malaysia and Singapore until 2008. On 23 May 2008, the International Court of Justice awarded the island to Singapore.

See also

 List of lighthouses in Singapore

Notes

References
.

Further reading
.
.
.

External links

 Picture of Horsburgh Lighthouse
 Amateur Radio Lighthouse Society World List of Lights (WLOL): Singapore
 Horsburgh Lighthouse on Lighthouse Depot
 Horsburgh Lighthouse on Singapore Infopedia
 

Lighthouses completed in 1851
Lighthouses in Singapore
Pedra Branca, Singapore
1851 establishments in the British Empire
19th-century architecture in Singapore